A Way Out may refer to:
 A Way Out (TV series), a Canadian TV series on CBC Television
 A Way Out (video game), a 2018 video game published by Electronic Arts

See also 
 The Way Out (disambiguation)